Route 15 is  long and is in the southeastern corner of the province of New Brunswick. Starting at the north end of the Petitcodiac River Causeway, it loops around the city of Moncton on Wheeler Boulevard, then turns northeast from Dieppe to Shediac. From there, it turns east and bypasses Cap-Pelé crossing the Scoudouc River, then southeast to meet the Trans-Canada Highway at Port Elgin. The highway is a divided freeway from Moncton to just east of Shediac, where it remains a controlled-access highway until east of Cap-Pele.

History 
Route 15 only extended from Shediac to Port Elgin until the early 1970s, when the Shediac Four-Lane Highway (the first rural expressway in New Brunswick) was built from Dieppe to Shediac. Its construction was controversial, with critics alleging that it was only built to give Moncton-area politicians better access to their summer cottages in the Shediac area. A two-lane bypass of Shediac itself was built shortly afterward.

The Wheeler Boulevard was developed and constructed through the 1970s and 1980s, and was fully complete by 1989.

A two-lane bypass of Cap-Pele opened to traffic in 1998. Since then it has proven itself to be a very dangerous highway artery in southeastern New Brunswick.

In 2012, a section of this highway between Moncton and Shediac was designated "Veteran's Memorial Highway".

Major intersections

See also
List of New Brunswick provincial highways

References

015
015
Shediac
Transport in Dieppe, New Brunswick
Transport in Moncton
Ring roads in Canada
Monuments and memorials in New Brunswick